HD 24479, also designated as HR 1204, is a solitary, bluish-white hued star located in the northern circumpolar constellation Camelopardalis. The star is visible to the naked eye with an apparent visual magnitude of 5.04. Based on Gaia DR3 parallax measurements, it is located 385 light years from the Sun. At its current distance, HD 24479's brightness is diminished by 0.29 magnitudes due to interstellar dust.

In 1932, HD 24479 was identified as a Be star by Olin C. Wilson at the Mount Wilson Observatory. In 1969, astronomer Anne Cowley and her colleauges listed a stellar classification of B9.5 V, matching a B-type main-sequence star. Slettebak (1982) gave it a class of B9 IV, suggesting this instead an evolving subgiant star. Zorec and Royer (2012) model it to be an evolved dwarf star that has completed 85.9% of its main sequence lifetime.

It has an estimated 3.14 times the mass of the Sun and 4.1 times the Sun's radius, which is large for its class.

References

External links
http://www.alcyone.de/cgi-bin/search.pl?object=HR1204 
http://server3.wikisky.org/starview?object_type=1&object_id=1873

B-type main-sequence stars
B-type subgiants
Camelopardalis (constellation)
Durchmusterung objects
024479
018505
1204